Horsforth Hall Park is a large community park in Horsforth, West Yorkshire, England, approximately six miles from Leeds city centre.

The park's attractions include large spaces of open parkland, a cricket pitch, a bowling green, an adventure playground, a bandstand and a Japanese
formal garden. It is the home of Horsforth Hall Park Cricket Club.

It also hosts a specially designed playground for under eights that allows disabled and able bodied children to play together.

See also
Listed buildings in Horsforth

References 

Parks and commons in Leeds